Mendhar is a tehsil (administrative district) in the Poonch district of the Indian union territory of Jammu and Kashmir. It is located in the foothills of Pir Panjal range within the Himalayas. The Mendhar Tehsil headquarters is in Mendhar town.

Geography

Demographics

The total projected population of Mendhar Tehsil is 112,723, with 57,723 males and 55,000 females according to the 2011 census of India. The population includes Paharis, Gujjars, Bakarwals and Kashmiris. There are two blocks; Balakote and Mendhar. There are a total of 50 villages and 50 panchayats in Mendhar Tehsil.

Places of interest
Ziarat Peer Fateh Shah Darya: It is located at Dobraj village of Mankote tehsils about 15 km away from Mendhar town. The shrine is covered by lofty mountains and dense forest. A gigantic Urs is celebrated twice in a year in which people across the Mendhar town attend the Urs and pay obeisance to the Peer Fateh Shah Darya.

Krishna Ghati
The site is known for its landscapes and natural environment. The areas near it are dangerous due to continuous ceasefire violations.

Ziyarat Chhote Shah Sahib
Ziyarat Chhote Shah Sahib is located in the village Sakhi Maidan of Mendhar tehsil. This Ziyarat was built in memory of Saint Sakhi Peer Chhote Shah. A few hundred yards away lie the ruins of ancient architecture popularly believed to be of the Pandvas.
Ziarat Mian Peeru Sahib: It is situated at top of Topa and kashblari hill at Thera Topa about 10 km distance from Mendhar town. It covers lofty and snowy mountains along with the dense forest. Every year thousands of devotees visits the shrine.

Ram Kund
Ram Kund is the oldest Hindu temple in Poonch region. It is located in the village of Chajjla,  from Mendhar. This temple was built by Lalitaditya between 724 and 761. In the temple's courtyard there are three sacred ponds, known as Ramkund, Lakshmankund and Sitakund. A water spring also emerges from Ramkund. Pilgrims visit during the month of March in Chaitra chawdish.

Villages
All the offices are situated at Gohlad. It is also known as Gohlad Town. SDM Office,Treasury Office Tehsil Office, Bus stand, Hospital, Police Station & All other office of the Tehsil Mendhar is situated in main Market of Gohlad Town.
Jamia Masjid is one of the oldest mosques in Gohlad Town.

The Battle of Topa was fought here by the 5 Gorkha Rifles during the Indo-Pakistani War of 1965.

Salwah It is a beautiful small Valley in Mendhar. It is about 7 km from Mendhar Town. Starting from Jughal from south and end at foot of Dana Shahsatar Mountain.
Topa,Mendhar and Bhera lies on the south east.Jughal,Mankote,lies on South west. Kannetti, Bonala lies on the northwest adjoining Kalaban. Surankote lies on the north. Therpur is a village at top of the mountain of Ther. Khorbani is at the east of it. A hill station Danna shahsataar is about 4 km away. There is Higher Secondary school, a Mini stadium, a Health centre, 3 middle schools, 4 primary schools and 3 private schools up to Grade 8.

Mankote is also one of the villages of Mendhar. At Mankote, there is a defence Camp that provides facilities to the people of that village during any problem created due to shelling from Pakistan.

Balnoi is also a large village in Tehsil Mendhar. In 1947 mostly the people of Balnoi migrated to Pakistan.

Chak Banola village is located about 15 km from Mendhar. It consists of fertile land for cultivation, encompassing a wide variety of floras. Chak Banola has about 1500 population(2011 census).

Kalaban is a remote village of Mendhar located 20 km away from Mendhar Tehsil.

Sagra: it is a magnificent village situated on the right bank of Mandheri river at Tehsil Mankote around 13 km away from Mendhar town. There are two playing grounds which attract cricketer lovers from adjoining districts. During the summer season the climate of the sagra is much hottest.

Transportation

Air
Poonch Airport is a non-operational airstrip in Poonch. The nearest airport to Mendhar is Sheikh ul-Alam International Airport in Srinagar, located 175 kilometres from Poonch.

Rail
There is no railway connectivity to Mendhar. There are plans to construct a Jammu–Poonch line which will connect Jammu with Poonch with railways. The nearest major railway station is Jammu Tawi railway station located 210 kilometres from Mendhar.

Road
The tehsil is well-connected to other places in Jammu and Kashmir and India by the NH 144A and other intra-district roads. Bypass road is under construction Via Dachhal to Ari Bridge.

See also
Poonch
Jammu and Kashmir
Rajouri
Surankote
Jammu

References

External links
 The Official Website of Jammu and Kashmir Government, India
 Official Website of District Poonch, India
 Poonch Tehsil map, mapsofindia.com.

Poonch district, India
India–Pakistan border